The Temora–Roto railway line is a partly closed railway line in the southwest of New South Wales, Australia. It branches from the Lake Cargelligo line at the town of Temora and travels west through the northern part of the Riverina to the towns of Griffith and Hillston. A connection to the Broken Hill line created a cross-country route, although this was never utilised to its full potential, and the line beyond Hillston was built to low grade 'pioneer' standards.

The line opened in stages in the 1920s. The line is now only used for goods haulage, mainly wheat, and is closed beyond Hillston. Passenger services were operated by CPH type railmotors from 1926 until 1974 when services were withdrawn between Griffith and Hillston. Services between Temora and Griffith continued until November 1983 when they too were withdrawn and replaced by road coach services (services continued between Griffith and Junee via Narrandera until 1986). Griffith station is the only passenger station that remains open, and although this line via Temora is the shortest connection to Griffith, passenger trains now operate only over the longer route via Narrandera, as this line travels through larger population centres.

See also
Rail transport in New South Wales

References 

Regional railway lines in New South Wales
Standard gauge railways in Australia